The legislature of the U.S. state of Florida has convened many times since statehood became effective on March 3, 1845.

Legislatures

 1st Session, 1845 
 2nd Session, 1846 
 12th General Assembly, 1862–1863 
 1st Florida Legislature, 1969–1970 
 24th Florida Legislature, 2015–2016 
 25th Florida Legislature, 2017–2018 
 2017: March 7-May 8, June 7–9, 2017 
 2018: January 9–March 11, 2018 
 2019: March 5–May 3, 2019

See also
 List of speakers of the Florida House of Representatives
 List of presidents of the Florida Senate
 List of governors of Florida
 History of Florida

References

External links
 Florida Department of State, Division of Library and Information Services. Legislative History
  (library guide)
 

Legislatures
Legislature
 
Florida
Florida
florida